John Sandon (born 1959) is a British expert and prolific author on ceramics and glass. He is best known as an expert on the BBC's Antiques Roadshow, which he joined in 1985.

Biography
The son of Henry Sandon, a notable authority on Royal Worcester porcelain, John Sandon left school aged 16 and went to work at auction house Bonhams (formerly Phillips) in London in 1975, where he quickly established himself as a porcelain specialist. Since 1988 he has been the International Director of European Ceramics and Glass at Bonhams auctioneers in London. He is a world authority on European porcelain, and has written many books and articles on the subject.

Sandon has been involved in excavations at the Royal Worcester factory site and has authored or co-authored several books on the factory.

On 24 July 2013 Sandon took part as auctioneer for Bonhams covering the sale of Copeland porcelain, part of the contents of Trelissick House in Feock near Truro, Cornwall.

Sandon is a regular expert on the BBC's Antiques Roadshow.

Selected publications
Sandon, John British Porcelain Shire Books (2009)  
Sandon, John Worcester Porcelain Shire Library (2009) 
Sandon, John Miller's Collecting Porcelain Miller's Publications (2002) 
Sandon, John Phillips Guide to English Porcelain Murdoch Books (1993)  
Sandon, John Collecting Porcelain Mitchell Beazley (2002)  
Sandon, John Phillips Guide to English Porcelain of the 18th and 19th Centuries Premier Editions (1993) 
Sandon, John The Dictionary of Worcester Porcelain: 1751-1851 Antique Collectors' Club Ltd (1999)   
Sandon, John Starting to Collect Antique Glass Antique Collectors' Club Ltd (1999)  
Sandon, John Antique Porcelain Antique Collectors' Club Ltd (1997)   
Sandon, John The Ewers-Tyne Collection of Worcester Porcelain at Cheekwood (2007)

References

External links
Sandon on the Shire Books website
Sandon on the Bonhams website
Sandon on the PBS website
Sandon on TV.com

1959 births
Living people
Antiques experts
English television presenters
Mass media people from Worcester, England